Ruth Harris may refer to:

Ruth Harris (historian) (born 1958), American historian and author
Ruth Harris (scientist) (fl. from 1991), earthquake researcher
Ruth Berman Harris (cantor) (fl. from 1996), Argentinian cantor
Ruth Berman Harris (harpist) (1916–2013), musician